KESC (99.7 FM) is a non-commercial radio station that is licensed to Morro Bay, California and broadcasts to the San Luis Obispo, California area. The station is owned by the University of Southern California (USC) and rebroadcasts the classical music format of KUSC in Los Angeles.

History
The station first signed on May 1, 1991 as KWWV and broadcast an adult contemporary music format. KWWV was acquired by Salisbury Broadcasting in 1994. The station changed its format to smooth jazz by 1998. In 1999, KWWV changed its call letters to KKAL and adopted a top 40 format as 99.7 KISS-FM modeled after KIIS-FM in Los Angeles

In October 2006, Mapleton Communications announced that it was purchasing the station, then bearing the call letters KXTY, from Salisbury for $1 million. However, this transaction was not completed. On August 20, 2007, Lazer Communications acquired the rights to purchase KXTY, then airing a talk radio format, from Mapleton. On November 19, Lazer changed the format of KXTY to (Spanish adult contemporary) music.

On February 11, 2009, the University of Southern California purchased KXTY for $1.2 million, adding the signal to its network of stations relaying KUSC, a non-commercial station in Los Angeles airing classical music. In preparation for the format change, KXTY went silent on April 22 (according to 100000watts.com). On May 13, 2009, the station began rebroadcasting KUSC's signal with new call letters KESC.

References

External links

ESC
Classical music radio stations in the United States
Mass media in San Luis Obispo County, California
NPR member stations
Morro Bay
San Luis Obispo, California
Radio stations established in 1991
1991 establishments in California